Acraga andina is a moth of the family Dalceridae. It is found in Andes Mountains of Venezuela, Colombia, Ecuador and Peru. The habitat consists of tropical wet, tropical premontane wet, tropical premontane moist and probably tropical montane wet forests.

The length of the forewings is 14–17 mm for males and 19 mm for females. Adults are similar to Acraga hamata, but the forewings are slightly darker. Adults are on wing in February, July and December.

Etymology
The species name refers to the Andes Mountains, where the species occurs.

References

Dalceridae
Moths described in 1994